Vyara railway station is a railway station in Tapi district of Gujarat state of India. It is under Mumbai WR railway division of Western Railway zone of Indian Railways. Vyara railway station is 61 km far away from Surat railway station. It is located on Udhna – Jalgaon main line of the Indian Railways.

It is located at 90 m above sea level and has two platform. As of 2016, electrified double broad-gauge railway line exists at this station. Passenger, MEMU, Express and Superfast trains halt here.

Nearby stations

Lotarva is the nearest railway station towards Surat, whereas Kikakui Road is the nearest railway station towards Jalgaon.

Major trains

The following Express and Superfast trains halt at Vyara railway station in both directions:

 12834/33 Howrah–Ahmedabad Superfast Express
 19045/46 Tapti Ganga Express
 22947/48 Surat–Bhagalpur Express
 19051/52 Shramik Express
 19025/26 Surat–Amravati Express
 12655/56 Navjeevan Express

See also
Bardoli railway station
Tapi district

References

Railway stations in Tapi district
Mumbai WR railway division